Fak Yaass is a Canadian television miniseries, which premiered in 2019 on OutTV. The series stars Vasilios Filippakis as Nico Nicolakis, a young gay man living in Toronto who is summoned home to Tecumseh by his Greek Canadian family to help take care of his ailing grandfather.

The cast also includes Nicholas Combitsis, Helen Hayden, Stephanie Herrera, Shadrack Jackman, Steve Kaklamanos, Leanne Noelle Smith, Liz Taylor and Charlie David. The series was directed by Matthew McLaughlin for Bulldog Productions.

The series title is a pun referencing both "fak yaas", an expression of approval common in contemporary LGBTQ culture, and fakes, a traditional Greek lentil soup.

The series premiered on June 17, 2019, on OutTV as a two-part miniseries, and is also distributed as a ten-part web series on the channel's streaming platform OutTVGo.

References

External links

2010s Canadian television miniseries
2010s Canadian LGBT-related drama television series
2010s Canadian comedy-drama television series
2010s Canadian LGBT-related comedy television series
2019 Canadian television series debuts
2019 Canadian television series endings
OutTV (Canadian TV channel) original programming
Greek-Canadian culture
Television shows set in Ontario
Canadian comedy-drama web series
Canadian LGBT-related web series
2019 web series debuts